Nicolae Grigorescu (15 May 1838 – 21 July 1907) was one of the founders of modern Romanian painting.

There is a metro station named after Grigorescu in Bucharest. It was given his name in 1990, before which it was named after Communist army general Leontin Sălăjan. Romanian currency features Grigorescu on the 10 Lei bank note.

Biography
He was born in Pitaru, Dâmbovița County, Wallachia now called Romania. In 1843 his family moved to Bucharest. In 1856 he created the historical composition Mihai scăpând stindardul (Michael the Brave saving the flag), which he presented to the Wallachian Prince Barbu Ştirbei, together with a petition asking for financial aid for his studies.

Between 1856 and 1857, he painted the church of the Zamfira monastery, Prahova County, and in 1861 the church of the Agapia monastery. With the help of Mihail Kogălniceanu, he received a scholarship to study in France.

In the autumn of 1861, young Grigorescu left for Paris, where he studied at the École des Beaux-Arts. He also attended the workshop of Sébastien Cornu, where he had as a colleague Pierre-Auguste Renoir. Knowing his weaknesses, he concentrated drawing and composition. However, he soon left this workshop and, attracted by the artistic concepts of the Barbizon school, he left Paris for that village, where he became the associate of artists such as Jean-François Millet, Jean-Baptiste-Camille Corot, Gustave Courbet and Théodore Rousseau. Under the influence of the movement, Grigorescu looked for new means of expression and followed the trend of en plein air painting, which was also important in Impressionism. As part of the Universal Exposition of Paris (1867), he contributed seven works. Then he exhibited at the Paris Salon of 1868 the painting Tânără ţigancă (Young Gypsy girl).

He returned to Romania a few times and starting in 1870 he participated in the exhibits of living artists and those organized by the Society of the Friends of the Belle-Arts. Between 1873 and 1874 he traveled to Italy, Greece and Vienna.

In 1877 he was called to accompany the Romanian Army as a "frontline painter" in the Romanian War of Independence. During the battles at the Grivitsa Strongpoint and Oryahovo, he made drawings and sketches which later used in creating larger-scale works.

In 1889 his work was featured in the Universal Exhibition in Paris and at the Romanian Atheneum. Centerpiece exhibits took place at the Romanian Atheneum would follow in 1891, 1895, 1897, 1902, and 1905.

From 1879 to 1890 he worked in France, especially in Vitré, Brittany, and in his workshop in Paris. In 1890 he settled in Câmpina and started depicting pastoral themes, especially portraits of peasant girls, pictures of ox carts on dusty country roads and other landscapes. He was named honorary member of the Romanian Academy in 1899.

At the time of his death, Grigorescu had been working on his Întoarcerea de la bâlci (The Return from the Fair). His house in Câmpina opened as the Nicolae Grigorescu Memorial Museum in 1957.

Works

External links

  Paintings at Zeno.org

1838 births
1907 deaths
People from Dâmbovița County
Honorary members of the Romanian Academy
Romanian muralists
Members of the Romanian Orthodox Church
Romanian painters
Romanian Impressionist painters
Romanian people of the Russo-Turkish War (1877–1878)
19th-century war artists
Romanian war artists